Dynamic Togolais (also known as Dyto) is a Togolese football club based in Lomé.

Stadium 
They play at the Stade Agoè-Nyivé and sometimes use 30,000 capacity Stade de Kégué for games.

Achievements

Togolese Championnat National: 6
 1970, 1971, 1997, 2001, 2004, 2012
Coupe du Togo: 3
 2001, 2002, 2005

Performance in CAF competitions
CAF Champions League: 2 appearances
1998 – First Round
2002 – Preliminary Round
 African Cup of Champions Clubs: 2 appearances
1971 – Quarter-Finals
1972 – Second Round
CAF Confederation Cup: 3 appearances
2004 – Preliminary Round
2006 – Preliminary Round
2011 – Preliminary Round
CAF Cup Winners' Cup: 1 appearance
2003 – First Round

Current squad
as of 2013

Notable players 

 Thomas Djilan

 Zakari Cissé

 Lamidi Mikel Akinkunmi

 Messan Ametokodo
 Komlan Amewou
 Zaire Apaloo Anoumou
 Ayi Assiongbon
 Koffi Bossou
 Abbe Ibrahim
 Nsouhoho Mensah
 Adekanmi Olufade

Notes 

Football clubs in Togo
Football clubs in Lomé
Association football clubs established in 1961
1961 establishments in Togo